is a Japanese-American actor and model. He was born in San Francisco, United States.

He is the son of musician Kazufumi Miyazawa and TV personality Dionne Mitsuoka.

Personal life
His father, musician Kazufumi Miyazawa is Japanese and his mother, TV personality Dionne Mitsuoka is half-American, which makes him a quarter American. He was born in California and was raised in Tokyo. He speaks English and Japanese. He likes fishing, baseball, and is a big fan of Yokohama DeNA BayStars. He studied at the University of California, Santa Cruz for two years then transferred to International Christian University where he graduated in March 2017.

Career
He started his career as an exclusive model for MEN'S NON-NO in 2015.

His first acting role was in the TBS drama Dr.Storks (Kōnodori) in 2017, as the new intern in the Obstetrics and Gynecology Department of Persona General Medical Center.

In 2018, he starred in the drama Kiss that Kills, which is his second acting role in his career. He got his first lead role in the NHK drama R134/The Promise at Shounan and was filmed in Yokohama, his mother's hometown. He also started to have roles in stage plays (BOAT and The Sea of Fertility) as well.

He got his first Shoujo manga drama adaptation role in the 2019 TV Asahi drama I give my first love to you (Boku no Hatsukoi wo Kimi ni Sasagu).
In January 2019, it was announced that he will be in the stage play CITY together with Yagira Yuya.

Last February 7, 2019, it was announced that he will play the role of Amane Murasame in the movie Kakegurui.

26 April, two days after his 25th birthday, it was announced that he will be playing the role of Jyo Banno in the drama adaptation of Gisou Furin by Akiko Higashimura.

Filmography

Film

TV Drama

TV Shows
 Otona no Kiso Eigo Season 5(2016.4.-2017.4.|NHK ETV) - Yuta Morishima 
 Kinyoubi Kurai Homeraretai (2016.11.4.-2018.3.30|BS ASAHI) - MC
 sumika no koshikake (2017.12.-2018.3.|Spaceshower TV) - Narrator
 sumika no koshikake Special Edition (2018.9., 2019.3.|Spaceshower TV) - Narrator, Guest Appearance

Stage Play
-2018-
BOAT (First lead role)
The Sea of Fertility
-2019-
CITY
-2020-
Pizarro
Anna Karenina(canceled due to covid-19)
The Enemy
-2021-
Pizarro

Commercials
JR SKI SKI (2017)
BODY MAINTE (2019–2021)

Music Videos
Vanilla Beans|Onna wa Sore wo Gaman shinai (2015)
sumika|Summer Vacation (2017)
Ando Yuko|Ichinichi no Owari ni (2020)

Awards

References

External links
 Official Profile Les Pros Entertainment
 Official Ameblo blog Hio's Chillaxing Blog
 
 
 Profile - MEN'S NON-NO
 Hio Miyazawa Official Site

1994 births
Living people
American people of Japanese descent
Japanese people of American descent
American emigrants to Japan
Male actors from San Francisco
Japanese male film actors
Japanese male stage actors
Japanese male television actors
21st-century Japanese male actors
Japanese male models
Best Supporting Actor Asian Film Award winners